Ephraim (also Efraim and Efraím) is a masculine given name of Hebrew and Aramaic origin, first used by the Israelite patriarch of that name. In the modern English language it is typically pronounced . In Hebrew, the name means "fruitful, fertile and productive".

People
Notable people with the name include:

Ephraim
Saint Ephrem the Syrian (c. 306 – 373), Syrian Christian monastic and hymnographer
Saint Ephraim of Antioch, Greek Orthodox Patriarch of Antioch (d. 545)
Ephraim Amu (1899–1995), Ghanaian composer
Ephraim Saul "Andy" Anderson (1911–2006), British bacteriologist
Ephraim Bull (1806-1895), creator of the Concord Grape
Ephraim Willard Burr (1809–1894), American politician
Ephraim Chambers (1680–1740), English writer
Ephraim Clarke (1846–1921), Australian politician
Ephraim Curzon (1883–?), English rugby league footballer
Ephraim Ellis (born 1985), Canadian actor
Ephraim Emerton (1851–1935), American medievalist historian
Ephraim Evron (1920–1995), Israeli diplomat
Ephraim S. Fisher (1815–1876), American judge
Ephraim Grizzard (d. 1892), American lynching victim
Ephraim Hart (1747–1825), American merchant
Ephraim P. Holmes (1908–1997), American admiral
Ephraim Jones (1750–1812), Canadian judge and politician
Ephraim Katz (1932–1992), Israeli-born American film historian
Ephraim Katzir (1916–2009), Israeli politician
Ephraim Keyser (1850–1937), American sculptor
Ephraim Kishon (1924–2005), Israeli writer
Ephraim Lederer (1862–1925), American lawyer
Ephraim Lewis (1968–1994), English singer-songwriter
Ephraim Lipson (1888–1960), British economic historian
Ephraim McDowell (1771–1830), American physician
Ephraim Morse (1823–1906), American businessman
Ephraim Oshry (1914–2003), Lithuanian-born American rabbi
Ephraim G. Peyton (1802–after 1876), American judge
Ephraim Salaam (born 1976), American football player
Ephraim Shay (1839–1916), American inventor
Ephraim Sidon (born 1946), Israeli author
Ephraim Sklyansky (1892–1925), Russian revolutionary
Ephraim Sparrow, American academic
Ephraim Stern (1934–2018), Israeli archaeologist
Ephraim Titler (b. 1800), Liberian politician
Ephraim Williams (1715–1755), American soldier
Ephraim King Wilson (1771–1834), American politician
Ephraim King Wilson II (1821–1891), American politician

Efraim
Efraim Allsalu (1929–2006), Estonian painter
Efraim Amira, Israeli football player
Efraim R. Arazi (Efi Arazi; 1937–2013), Israeli businessman
Efraim Birnbaum (Effi Birnbaum; born 1954), Israeli basketball coach
Efraím Cardozo (1877–1951), Paraguayan politician and historian
Efraim Diveroli, American arms dealer
Efraim Eitam (Effi Eitam; born 1952), Israeli politician
Efraim Gur (born 1955), Israeli politician
Efraim Halevy (born 1934), Israeli lawyer and intelligence officer
Efraim Karsh (born 1953), Israeli historian
Efraim Leo (born 1997), Swedish singer and songwriter
Efraim Margolin, Israeli-American businessman and philanthropist
Efraim Medina Reyes (born 1967), Colombian writer
Efraim Racker (1913–1991), Austrian biochemist
Efraím Rico (born 1967), Colombian cyclist
Efraim Sevela (1928–2010), Russian writer, Soviet dissident
Efraim Shalom (born 1934), Israeli politician
Efraim Sneh (born 1944), Israeli politician, physician and military commander
Efraim Taburi (1900–1957), Israeli Zionist activist and politician
Efraim "Effi" Wizen (born 1956), Israeli computer animator and visual effects specialist
Efraim Zuroff (born 1948), Israeli historian and Nazi hunter

Efraím
Efraím Basílio Krevey (1928–2012), Ukrainian Greek Catholic bishop in Brazil

Fictional characters
Ephraim Black, a character in the Twilight series
Ephraim Brown, a character in the TV series Everwood played by Gregory Smith
Ephraim Cabot, a character in Desire Under the Elms by Eugene O'Neill
Ephraim Lapham, a character in Johnny Tremain by Esther Forbes
Ephraim Tutt,  a character in the novels of Arthur Train
Ephraim Goodweather, a character in The Strain by Guillermo del Toro
Prince Ephraim, one of the two main characters of the video game Fire Emblem: The Sacred Stones.
Ephraim Winslow, a character in The Lighthouse

Masculine given names